London Woodberry (born May 28, 1991) is an American soccer player.

Career
Woodberry played college soccer at the University of Maryland between 2009 and 2012. He earned Third Team NSCAA All-American honors as a senior for the Maryland Terrapins in 2012, helping his squad to eight shutouts over the course of the season. Before his senior season, Woodberry played with USL PDL club Baltimore Bohemians during their inaugural 2012 season.

Woodberry signed a Homegrown contract with FC Dallas on January 9, 2013. He was waived in March 2014. Woodberry then signed with USL Pro club Arizona United on April 9, 2014.

Woodberry signed with MLS club New England Revolution after the club's 2015 preseason. He had played in all five preseason matches as Jay Heaps examined ways to fill out his roster.

On 16 January 2018, Woodberry joined USL expansion club Nashville SC. He was announced alongside forward Ropapa Mensah and fellow defender Jordan Dunstan. On November 14, 2018, Nashville announced that they had not re-signed Woodberry for the 2019 season.

On December 5, 2018, USL expansion side Austin Bold FC announced the signing of London Woodberry for the 2019 season. He was released by Austin at the end of the season.

References

External links
 

1991 births
Living people
American soccer players
Association football defenders
Austin Bold FC players
Baltimore Bohemians players
FC Dallas players
Homegrown Players (MLS)
Major League Soccer players
Maryland Terrapins men's soccer players
Nashville SC (2018–19) players
New England Revolution players
People from McKinney, Texas
Phoenix Rising FC players
Soccer players from Texas
Sportspeople from the Dallas–Fort Worth metroplex
United States men's youth international soccer players
USL Championship players
USL League Two players